Representative Office of South Ossetia, Donetsk is an unofficial diplomatic mission of South Ossetia. The office is located in the capital of the Donetsk People's Republic (DPR), Donetsk. South Ossetia has recognized the DPR, but it hasn't created an official embassy so far as of 2016.

History
South Ossetia recognized the DPR in 2014. The South Ossetian president Leonid Tibilov announced that the foreign ministry would establish the diplomatic mission in Donetsk. 

The representative office was opened in Donetsk, the DPR's capital, on 16 April 2015. It is the first foreign diplomatic mission in Donetsk. 

The Donetsk Ministry of Foreign Affairs proclaimed:

See also 

 International recognition of Abkhazia and South Ossetia
 International recognition of the Donetsk People's Republic and the Luhansk People's Republic
 List of diplomatic missions of South Ossetia
 List of diplomatic missions of the Donetsk People's Republic
 Foreign relations of South Ossetia

References

Foreign relations of South Ossetia
Donetsk People's Republic–South Ossetia relations